Park Royal Vehicles was one of Britain's leading coachbuilders and bus manufacturers, based at Park Royal, Abbey Road, in west London. With origins dating back to 1889, the company also had a Leeds-based subsidiary, Charles H. Roe.

Labour problems and slowness of production led to its closure in 1980.

Associated Commercial Vehicles
Associated with AEC from the 1930s in 1949 it became part of Associated Commercial Vehicles Ltd., which included AEC (the chassis manufacturer). This formidable combination of AEC and PRV supported the demanding requirements of London Transport and many other major fleet owners and operators. The famous AEC Routemaster bus was built at Park Royal.

Leyland Motors
In 1962 the ACV Group merged with the Leyland Motors group to form Leyland Motor Corporation. In 1968 Leyland Motor Corporation and British Motor Holdings merged, becoming British Leyland Motor Corporation. BL (British Leyland) was nationalised by the Labour Government in 1975, following which many subsidiaries were closed, including AEC in 1979 and Park Royal in July 1980.

Other vehicles

Park Royal was also responsible for many other coachworks besides London buses.  It had a vast array of vehicles to its name including the first diesel London Taxi, a number of railcars and railbuses (e.g. the British Rail Class 103 and one of the British Rail Railbuses) and World War II vehicles. During World War II it also played a part in the production of Halifax bombers as the outer wings and engine cowlings were built at the Park Royal site. Park Royal built 150 Green Goddesses during the period November 1954 to January 1955 with PRV body numbers B37444 - B37593 and registrations PGW51 - PGW200.

References

External links
 Site dedicated to Park Royal Vehicles
 Detailed history of Park Royal Vehicles

Defunct bus manufacturers of the United Kingdom
Vehicle manufacture in London
Associated Equipment Company
Companies based in the London Borough of Brent
History of the London Borough of Brent
Park Royal